Live in Miami @ The WDNA Jazz Gallery is an album by jazz pianist Roberto Magris recorded live in Miami at the WDNA radio station's Jazz Gallery, released on the JMood label in 2017, and featuring performances by the Roberto Magris Sextet, also including Brian Lynch.

Reception

The Down Beat review by Carlo Wolff awarded the album 4 stars and simply states: "While the mostly original material is comfortably within Magris’ revered bop tradition, the fire with which this group plays – goosed by the leader's keyboard pyrotechnics – puts the recording over the top."
The Chicago Jazz Magazine review by Hrayr Attarian simply states: "This alluring and enjoyable album captures Magris and his colleagues in peak form. It also demonstrates Magris’ superlative skills as a composer and bandleader. Live in Miami @The WDNA Jazz Gallery is both memorable and accessible and will prove to have a wide appeal."

Track listing

  African Mood (Roberto Magris) - 11:39
 What Blues? (Roberto Magris) - 8:33
 Song for an African Child (Roberto Magris) - 9:59
 April Morning (Rahsaan Roland Kirk) - 9:57
 Chachanada (Roberto Magris) - 9:31
 Il Bello del Jazz (Roberto Magris) - 9:50
 A Flower Is a Lovesome Thing (Billy Strayhorn) - 5:46
 Standard Life (Roberto Magris) - 9:16
 Blues for My Sleeping Baby (Roberto Magris) - 2:05

Personnel

Musicians
 Brian Lynch - trumpet
Jonathan Gomez - tenor sax
Roberto Magris - piano
Chuck Bergeron - bass
John Yarling - drums
Murph Aucamp - congas and percussion

Production
 Paul Collins – executive producer and co-producer
 Edward Blanco – co-producer
 Stephen Malagodi – engineering
Daria Lacy – design
 Stephen Malagodi and Nadja Debenjak – photography

References

Live jazz albums
2017 live albums
Roberto Magris albums